Inhuman is a 14-issue ongoing comic book series published by Marvel Comics focusing on Inhumans as a fallout from Infinity, published between April 2014 and June 2015. It was written by Charles Soule.

Overview
The series follows Medusa as she tries to lead the Inhumans following the disappearance of King Black Bolt in the aftermath of the Infinity event, in which new Inhumans, or "NuHumans", have sprung up around the globe.

Originally intended to debut in January 2014 as part of All-New Marvel NOW!, the departure of Matt Fraction as writer delayed the series release to April 2014.

Collected editions
Inhuman has been collected in the following hardcovers:

References

2014 comics debuts
Inhumans